Wyoming County International Speedway is an asphalt speedway located in Perry, New York, USA. The speedway was built in 1960 as a dirt racetrack called Perry Speedway. The speedway was paved in 1968, and the concrete retaining wall constructed. In 1985, the macadam was once again covered with a layer of dirt for a time period of 13 years. In 1998, under new ownership, WCIS returned to the highly competitive SST asphalt racing surface. Racing occurs every Saturday night at the Bullring.

Track operators
Promoter: James E. Majchrzak
Race Director: Don Vogler
General Manager: Polly Majchrzak
Secretary: Shawna Smith
Marketing: 
Chief Medical Director: George Deaton
Ambulance EMT: Chris Gray
Announcers: Pete Zehler and Dan Turner
Scorers: Rachel Babbit, Charolette Pringle and Rachel Horvatits
Photographer: Rob Micoli
Tech Inspectors: Ron Roberts
Head Starter: Steve Ott
Flaggers: Mike Jones, Don Packman, Doug Packman
Infield Director: Joe Horvatits
Safety Crew: Mike Adamczak, Bob Jones, Dan Olin, Darryl Jones, Joe Horvatits Jr. and Rich Fraser

Events held at WCIS
SST Racing Series
Jim Pierce Memorial
American 100 Modified Race

External links
 Official website
 Official WCIS Facebook Page
 Official MySpace
 SST Racing Series
 MM Sports Photos

Motorsport venues in New York (state)
NASCAR tracks
Buildings and structures in Wyoming County, New York
Tourist attractions in Wyoming County, New York
1960 establishments in New York (state)
Sports venues completed in 1960